Lattimer may refer to:


People
 John K. Lattimer, urologist, researcher of the Lincoln and Kennedy assassinations
 Pete Lattimer, fictional character in the U.S. television series Warehouse 13

Places
 Lattimer, Pennsylvania, United States, also known as "Lattimer Mines"
 Lattimer, West Virginia, United States

Other uses
 Lattimer House, a historic house in Searcy, Arkansas, United States
 Lattimer massacre, an 1897 massacre of striking miners at the Lattimer mine, Pennsylvania

See also
 Latimer (disambiguation)